Ferenc Mokanj a senior member of the Reformists of Vojvodina political party which was a member of the Democratic Opposition of Serbia coalition which finally ousted Slobodan Milosevic in October 2000 after he attempted to rig the Presidential election which he had lost in September of that year. Mr Mokanj was the Deputy Minister of Trade and Tourism in the Government of Serbia (2001-2004).

External links
 Slovenia News article mentioning Ferenc Mokanj

Living people
Reformists of Vojvodina politicians
Government ministers of Serbia
Year of birth missing (living people)